The rowing competitions at the 2nd African Youth Games in Gaborone were held from 24 May to 26 May 2014, at Gaborone Dam. Three medal events were contested by 32 athletes from 12 countries.

Tunisia was the most successful nation, topping the medal table with two golds and three in total. South Africa finished second with one gold and three medals overall. Egypt finished third with three bronze medals.

Venue
All of the rowing events were staged at Gaborone Dam located south of Gaborone along the Gaborone-Lobatse road.

Events 
There were three single scull events:
 500 m sprint for men.
 500 m sprint for women.
 500x2 mixed relay.

Medal table

Medal summary

Men's events

500 m sprint single sculls.

Women's events

500 m sprint single sculls.

Mixed Relay

500x2 mixed relay single sculls.

References

2014 African Youth Games
African Youth Games
2014 African Youth Games